Craig-y-penrhyn is a hamlet in the community of Llangynfelyn, Ceredigion, Wales, which is 79.3 miles (127.7 km) from Cardiff and 178.1 miles (286.6 km) from London. Craig-y-penrhyn is represented in the Senedd by Elin Jones (Plaid Cymru) and is part of the Ceredigion constituency in the House of Commons.

References

See also 
 List of localities in Wales by population 
 Penrhyn-coch, a village in Ceredigion

Villages in Ceredigion